Nyrðra-Vatnalautavatn is the largest body of water on Ófeigsfjarðarheiði in Iceland.

The lake is mostly famous for its idiosyncratic name.

Lakes of Iceland